Ayda is a Turkish given name. It means from the moon. It's a popular name in Azerbaijan, Iran, and Turkey.

Given name
 Ayda Field (born 1979), Turkish-American television actress

Surname
 Adile Ayda (1912–1992), first woman career diplomat of Turkey

Surnames
Turkish-language surnames
Turkish feminine given names